The St. Marys River, sometimes written St. Mary's River, drains Lake Superior, starting at the end of Whitefish Bay and flowing  southeast into Lake Huron, with a fall of . For its entire length it is an international border, separating Michigan in the United States from Ontario, Canada.

The twin cities of Sault Ste. Marie, Ontario, and Sault Ste. Marie, Michigan are connected across the St. Marys River by the Sault Ste. Marie International Bridge. The St. Marys Rapids are just below the river's exit from Lake Superior and can be bypassed by huge freight ships through the man-made Soo Locks and the Sault Ste. Marie Canal.

Two of the Ontario tributaries of this river are the Garden River and the Bar River. Other Canadian tributaries include Fort Creek, the Root River, the Little Carp River, the Big Carp River, the Lower Echo River, Desbarats River, and the Two Tree River. The American tributaries to the St. Marys River are the Gogomain River, the Munuscong River, the Little Munuscong River, the Charlotte River, and the Waiska River.

History

French explorer Étienne Brûlé was the first European to travel up the rapids in about 1621. In 1641 Jesuit priests Isaac Jogues and Charles Raymbault ventured the same route as Brûlé, finding many Ojibwe at the rapids, and named it Sault Ste. Marie. Sault (Middle and early Modern French spelling of ) means "jump"; hence, the secondary meaning "rapids" because the water 'jumps.'

Fort St. Joseph was built on the Canadian shore in 1796 to protect a trading post, and ensure continued British control of the area.  The fort fulfilled its role in the War of 1812.

The first modern lock was completed in May 1855 by Erastus Corning's St. Mary's Falls Ship Canal Company, and was known as the "American Lock".  Today, there are four parallel locks on the American side of the river, although only two are in regular use.  The Soo Locks became part of the Great Lakes Waterway system in 1959.

Partially due to the American refusal of passage through the Soo Locks during the Wolseley Expedition, a Canadian Lock was built in 1895. The current Canadian Lock is used for recreational boats and is a National Historic Site of Canada.

During World War II, the Soo Locks and the St. Marys River waterway were heavily guarded by U.S. and Canadian forces coordinated by the U.S. Army's Central Defense Command. During the waterway's usable season from March through November, 90 percent of the United States' iron ore production for domestic use passed through it in 1939, making the waterway critical to maintaining war production. A battalion of infantry, stationed at nearby Fort Brady, provided security beginning just after the outbreak of the European war in September 1939; this was reduced to a company in mid-1940 and replaced by a military police battalion in May 1941. After Pearl Harbor in December 1941, fear of possible air or paratroop attacks by German forces led to a major expansion of defence measures. Scenarios envisioned included U-boats in Hudson Bay launching attack aircraft, and one-way bombing or paratroop missions along a great circle route from German-occupied Norway. Units deployed included the 131st Infantry Regiment, an anti-aircraft regiment, and a barrage balloon battalion for a total in mid-1942 of 7,000 troops in the area. Canada provided an anti-aircraft battalion, elements of the Royal Canadian Mounted Police, barracks and defensive positions for some of the U.S. force, and a warning system of 266 aircraft observation posts of the Aircraft Identity Corps extending northward to Hudson Bay. This was augmented by five U.S.-staffed radar stations in northern Ontario. By late 1943, with no threat emerging and spare components stockpiled in the event of lock damage, the U.S. forces were cut to 2,500 troops, and the AA and air warning defences were abandoned. In January 1944 the garrison was further reduced to a single military police battalion.

Islands
Drummond Island (Michigan)
Neebish Island (Michigan)
St. Joseph Island (Ontario)
Squirrel Island (Ontario / Garden River First Nation)
Sugar Island (Michigan)
Whitefish Island (Ontario / Batchewana First Nation)
Lime Island (Michigan)

Works

Bridges

The Sault Ste. Marie International Bridge, a steel truss arch bridge, takes road traffic across the river. Directly to the west is the Sault Ste. Marie International Railroad Bridge, which carries rail traffic on a single set of tracks.

Power plants
The Edison Sault Electric Hydroelectric Plant, located at the eastern end of the Sault Ste. The plant consists of 74 three-phase generators capable of generating 25 to 30 megawatts. It was completed in 1902. The hydro plant is faced with stone quarried during the excavation of the Sault Ste. Marie Power Canal.

The United States Army Corps of Engineers owns and operates a hydroelectric generating plant directly north of the American locks.

Finally, the Francis H. Clergue Generating Station, owned and operated by Brookfield Renewable Energy, Inc., is a hydroelectric generating plant located directly north of the Canadian lock with a generating capacity of 52 MW. It was completed in 1981.

Canal 
The Edison Sault Power Canal is used to power the Saint Marys Falls Hydropower Plant at its eastern end. The canal separated downtown Sault Ste. Marie, Michigan, from its mainland, making it an island. It was begun in September 1898 as the Michigan Lake Superior Power Company Canal, but completed by Edison Sault Electric Company in June 1902.

Locks

The American Soo Locks are the major transportation route around the St. Marys Rapids, but the Canadian Sault Ste. Marie Canal is still used by recreational and tour boats.

Other works

A set of compensating works are located at the mouth of the rapids, which are used to control the outflow of water from Lake Superior. The works consists of 16 gates, half of which are on the American side, and the other half on the Canadian side of the river. They were completed between 1901 and 1921. This flow is controlled by the International Joint Commission.

A concrete berm was constructed along the north side of the rapids as remedial works to protect fish spawning habitat from lower outflow through the rapids. This was due, in part, to an increase of water outflow from the three hydroelectric dams.

Pollution 

The Saint Marys River is listed as a Great Lakes Areas of Concern in the Great Lakes Water Quality Agreement between the United States and Canada.

See also
List of rivers of Michigan
List of rivers of Ontario

References

External links

 Canadian Heritage web site for St. Marys River
 GreatLakes.net Real time Water levels on St. Marys River (with map)

 
Great Lakes Waterway
Sault Ste. Marie
Canadian Heritage Rivers
Border rivers
Rivers of Michigan
Rivers of Algoma District
Straits of Michigan
Straits of Canada
International rivers of North America
Canada–United States border
Tributaries of Lake Huron
Rivers of Chippewa County, Michigan
Landforms of Sault Ste. Marie, Ontario